Chulalongkorn (20 September 1853 – 23 October 1910) was the fifth monarch of Siam under the House of Chakri, titled Rama V. He was known to the Siamese of his time as Phra Phuttha Chao Luang (พระพุทธเจ้าหลวง, the Royal Buddha).

Chulalongkorn's reign was characterised by the modernisation of Siam, governmental and social reforms, and territorial concessions to the British and French. As Siam was surrounded by European colonies, Chulalongkorn, through his policies and acts, ensured the independence of Siam. All his reforms were dedicated to ensuring Siam's independence given the increasing encroachment of Western powers, so that Chulalongkorn earned the epithet Phra Piya Maharat (พระปิยมหาราช, the Great Beloved King).

Early life

King Chulalongkorn was born on 20 September 1853 to King Mongkut and Queen Debsirindra and given the name Chulalongkorn. In 1861, he was designated Krommamuen Pikhanesuan Surasangkat. His father gave him a broad education, including instruction from Western tutors such as Anna Leonowens. In 1866, he became a novice monk for six months at Wat Bawonniwet according to royal tradition. Upon his return to his secular life in 1867, he was designated Krommakhun Phinit Prachanat (.)

In 1867, King Mongkut led an expedition to the Malay Peninsula south of the city of Hua Hin, to verify his calculations of the solar eclipse of 18 August 1868. Both father and son fell ill of malaria. Mongkut died on 1 October 1868. Assuming the 15 year-old Chulalongkorn to be dying as well, King Mongkut on his deathbed wrote, "My brother, my son, my grandson, whoever you all the senior officials think will be able to save our country will succeed my throne, choose at your own will."  Si Suriyawongse, the most powerful government official of the day, managed the succession of Chulalongkorn to the throne and his own appointment as regent. The first coronation was held on 11 November 1868. Chulalongkorn's health improved, and he was tutored in public affairs.

The young Chulalongkorn was an enthusiastic reformer. He visited Singapore and Java in 1870 and British India in 1872 to study the administration of British colonies. He toured the administrative centres of Calcutta, Delhi, Bombay, and back to Calcutta in early 1872. This journey was a source of his later ideas for the modernization of Siam. He was crowned king in his own right as Rama V on 16 November 1873.

Si Suriyawongse then arranged for the Front Palace of King Pinklao (who was his uncle) to be bequeathed to King Pinklao's son, Prince Yingyot (who was Chulalongkorn's cousin).

As regent, Si Suriyawongse wielded great influence. Si Suriyawongse continued the works of King Mongkut. He supervised the digging of several important khlongs, such as Padung Krungkasem and Damneun Saduak, and the paving of roads such as Charoen Krung and Silom. He was also a patron of Thai literature and performing arts.

Early reign

At the end of his regency, Si Suriyawonse was raised to Somdet Chao Phraya, the highest title a noble could attain. Si Suriyawongse was the most powerful noble of the 19th century. His family, the House of Bunnag, was a powerful aristocratic dynasty of Persian descent. It dominated Siamese politics since the reign of Rama I. Chulalongkorn then married four of his half-sisters, all daughters of Mongkut: Savang Vadhana, Saovabha, and Sunandha (Mongkut with concubine Piam), and Sukumalmarsri (Monkut with concubine Samli).

Chulalongkorn's first reform was to establish the "Auditory Office" (Th: หอรัษฎากรพิพัฒน์) on 4 June 1873, solely responsible for tax collection, to counter the influence of the Bunnag family whom had been in control of weath collection since early Rattanakosin. As tax collectors had been under the aegis of various nobles and thus a source of their wealth, this reform caused great consternation among the nobility, especially the Front Palace. Chulalongkorn appointed Chaturonrasmi to be an executive of the organization, which he closely oversaw. From the time of King Mongkut, the Front Palace had been the equivalent of a "second king", with one-third of national revenue allocated to it. Prince Yingyot of the Front Palace was known to be on friendly terms with many Britons, at a time when Siamese relations with the British Empire were tense.

In 1874, Chulalongkorn established the Council of State as a legislative body and a privy council as his personal advisory board based on the British privy council. Council members were appointed by the monarch.

Front Palace crisis

On the night of 28 December 1874, a fire broke out near the gunpowder storehouse and gasworks in the main palace. Front Palace troops quickly arrived, fully armed, "to assist in putting out the fire". They were denied entrance and the fire was extinguished. The incident demonstrated the considerable power wielded by aristocrats and royal relatives, leaving the king little power. Reducing the power held by the nobility became one of his main motives in reforming Siam's feudal politics.

When Prince Yingyot died in 1885, Chulalongkorn took the opportunity to abolish the titular Front Palace and created the title of "Crown Prince of Siam" in line with Western custom. Chulalongkorn's son, Prince Vajirunhis, was appointed the first Crown Prince of Siam, though he never reigned. In 1895, when the prince died of typhoid at age 16, he was succeeded by his half-brother Vajiravudh, who was then at boarding school in England.

Haw insurgency

In the northern Laotian lands bordering China, the insurgents of the Taiping Rebellion had taken refuge since the reign of King Mongkut. These Chinese were called Haw and became bandits, pillaging the villages. In 1875, Chulalongkorn sent troops from Bangkok to crush the Haw who had ravaged as far as Vientiane. However, they met strong Chinese resistance and retreated to Isan in 1885. New, modernized forces were sent again and were divided into two groups approaching the Haw from Chiang Kam and Pichai. The Haw scattered and some fled to Vietnam. The Siamese armies proceeded to eliminate the remaining Haw. The city of Nong Khai maintains memorials for the Siamese dead.

Third Anglo-Burmese War

In Burma, while the British Army fought the Burmese Konbaung Dynasty, Siam remained neutral. Britain had agreements with the Siamese government, which stated that if the British were in conflict with Burma, Siam would send food supplies to the British Army. Chulalongkorn honored the agreement. The British expected he would send an army to help defeat the Burmese, but he did not do so.

Military and political reforms

Freed of the Front Palace and Chinese rebellions, Chulalongkorn initiated modernization and centralization reforms. He established the Royal Military Academy in 1887 to train officers in Western fashion. His upgraded forces provided the king much more power to centralize the country.

The government of Siam had remained largely unchanged since the 15th century. The central government was headed by the Samuha Nayok (i.e., prime minister), who controlled the northern parts of Siam, and the Samuha Kalahom (i.e., grand commander), who controlled southern Siam in both civil and military affairs. The Samuha Nayok presided over the Chatu Sadombh (i.e., Four Pillars). The responsibilities of each pillar overlapped and were ambiguous. In 1888, Chulalongkorn moved to institute a government of ministries. Ministers were, at the outset, members of the royal family. Ministries were established in 1892, with all ministries having equal status.

The Council of State proved unable to veto legal drafts or to give Chulalongkorn advice because the members regarded Chulalongkorn as an absolute monarch, far above their station. Chulalongkorn dissolved the council altogether and transferred advisory duties to the cabinet in 1894.

Chulalongkorn abolished the traditional Nakorn Bala methods of torture in the judiciary process, which were seen as inhumane and barbaric to Western eyes, and introduced a Western judicial code. His Belgian advisor, Rolin-Jaequemyns, played a great role in the development of modern Siamese law and its judicial system.

Pressures for reform

Chulalongkorn was the first Siamese king to send royal princes to Europe to be educated. In 19th century Europe, nationalism flourished and there were calls for more liberty. The princes were influenced by the liberal notions of democracy and elections they encountered in republics like France and constitutional monarchies like the United Kingdom.

In 1884 (year 103 of the Rattakosin Era), Siamese officials in Europe warned Chulalongkorn of possible threats to Siamese independence from the European powers. They advised that Siam should be reformed like Meiji Japan and that Siam should become a constitutional monarchy. Chulalongkorn demurred, stating that the time was not ripe and that he himself was making reforms.

Throughout Chulalongkorn's reign, writers with radical ideas had their works published for the first time. The most notable ones included Thianwan Wannapho, who had been imprisoned for 17 years and from prison produced many works criticizing traditional Siamese society.

Conflict with French Indochina

In 1863, King Norodom of Cambodia was forced to put his country under French protection. The cession of Cambodia was officially formulated in 1867. However, Inner Cambodia (as called in Siam) consisting of Battambang, Siam Nakhon, and Srisopon, remained a Siamese possession. This was the first of many territorial cessions.

In 1887, French Indochina was formed from Vietnam and Cambodia. In 1888, French troops invaded northern Laos to subjugate the Heo insurgents. However, the French troops never left, and the French demanded more Laotian lands. In 1893 Auguste Pavie, the French vice-consul of Luang Prabang, requested the cession of all Laotian lands east of the Mekong River. Siam resented the demand, leading to the Franco–Siamese War of 1893.

The French gunboat Le Lutin entered the Chao Phraya and anchored near the French consulate ready to attack. Fighting was observed in Laos. Inconstant and Comete were attacked in Chao Phraya, and the French sent an ultimatum: an indemnity of three million francs, as well as the cession of and withdrawal from Laos. Siam did not accept the ultimatum. French troops then blockaded the Gulf of Siam and occupied Chantaburi and Trat. Chulalongkorn sent Rolin-Jacquemyns to negotiate. The issue was eventually settled with the cession of Laos in 1893, but the French troops in Chantaburi and Trat refused to leave.

The cession of vast Laotian lands had a major impact on Chulalongkorn's spirit. Prince Vajirunhis died in 1894. Prince Vajiravudh was created crown prince to replace him. Chulalongkorn realised the importance of maintaining the navy and established the Royal Thai Naval Academy in 1898.

Despite Siamese concessions, French armies continued the occupation of Chantaburi and Trat for another 10 years. An agreement was reached in 1903 that French troops would leave Chantaburi but hold the coast land from Trat to Koh Kong. In 1906, the final agreement was reached. Trat was returned to Siam but the French kept Koh Kong and received Inner Cambodia.

Seeing the seriousness of foreign affairs, Chulalongkorn visited Europe in 1897. He was the first Siamese monarch to do so, and he desired European recognition of Siam as a fully independent power. He appointed his queen, Saovabha Phongsri, as regent in Siam during his travel to Europe. During a visit to Spain and Portugal, on 26 October, he condemned and ordered his servant to be executed for a breach of etiquette committed in Lisbon, according to the telegram news from Saragossa.

Reforms

Siam had been composed of a network of cities according to the Mandala system codified by King Trailokanat in 1454, with local rulers owing tribute to Bangkok. Each city retained a substantial degree of autonomy, as Siam was not a "state" but a "network" of city-states.  With the rise of European colonialism, the Western concept of state and territorial division was introduced. It had to define explicitly which lands were "Siamese" and which lands were "foreign". The conflict with the French in 1893 was an example.

Sukhaphiban districts 
Sukhaphiban sanitary districts were the first sub-autonomous entities established in Thailand. The first such was created in Bangkok, by royal decree of King Chulalongkorn in 1897. During his European tour earlier that year, he had learned about the sanitary districts of England, and wanted to try out this local administrative unit in his capital.

Monthon system 

With his experiences during the travel to British colonies and the suggestion of Prince Damrong, Chulalongkorn established the hierarchical system of monthons in 1897, composed of province, city, amphoe, tambon, and muban (village) in descending order. (Though an entire monthon, the Eastern Province, Inner Cambodia, was ceded to the French in 1906).  Each monthon was overseen by an intendant of the Ministry of Interior. This had a major impact, as it ended the power of all local dynasties. Central authority now spread all over the country through the administration of intendants. For example, the Lanna states in the north (including the Kingdom of Chiangmai, Principalities of Lampang, Lamphun, Nan, and Prae, tributaries to Bangkok) were made into two monthons, neglecting the existence of the Lanna kings.

Local rulers did not cede power willingly. Three rebellions sprang up in 1901: the Ngeaw rebellion in Phrae, the 1901–1902 Holy Man's Rebellion in Isan, and the Rebellion of Seven Sultans in the south. All these rebellions were crushed in 1902 with the city rulers stripped of their power and imprisoned.

Abolition of corvée and slavery

Ayutthaya King Ramathibodi II established a system of corvée in 1518 after which the lives of Siamese commoners and slaves were closely regulated by the government. All Siamese common men ( ไพร่) were subject to the Siamese corvée system. Those conscripted into military service were called .

Chulalongkorn was best known for his abolition of Siamese slavery (ทาส.) He associated the abolition of slavery in the United States with the bloodshed of the American Civil War. Chulalongkorn, to prevent such a bloodbath in Siam, provided several steps towards the abolition of slavery, not an extreme turning point from servitude to total freedom. Those who found themselves unable to live on their own sold themselves into slavery by rich noblemen. Likewise, when a debt was defaulted, the borrower would become a slave of the lender. If the debt was redeemed, the slave regained freedom.

However, those whose parents were household slaves (ทาสในเรือนเบี้ย) were bound to be slaves forever because their redemption price was extremely high.

Because of economic conditions, people sold themselves into slavery in great numbers and in turn they produced a large number of household slaves. In 1867 they accounted for one-third of Siamese population. In 1874, Chulalongkorn enacted a law that lowered the redemption price of household slaves born in 1867 (his ascension year) and freed all of them when they had reached 21.

The newly freed slaves would have time to settle themselves as farmers or merchants so they would not become unemployed. In 1905, the Slave Abolition Act ended Siamese slavery in all forms. The reverse of 100 baht banknotes in circulation since the 2005 centennial depict Chulalongkorn in navy uniform abolishing the slave tradition.

Chulalongkorn needed  more effective control of manpower to undo the power of nobility. After the establishment of the monthon system, Chulalongkorn instituted a census to count all men available to the government. The Employment Act of 1900 required that all workers be paid, not forced to work.

Establishment of a modern army and modern land ownership

Chulalongkorn had established a defence ministry in 1887. The ending of the corvée system necessitated the beginning of military conscription, thus the Conscription Act of 1905 in Siam. This was followed in 1907 by the first act providing for invoking martial law, which seven years later was changed to its modern form by his son and successor, King Vajiravudh.

The Royal Thai Survey Department, a Special Services Group of the Royal Thai Armed Forces, engaged in cadastral survey, which is the survey of specific land parcels to define ownership for land registration, and for equitable taxation. Land title deeds are issued using the Torrens title system, though it was not until the year 1901 that the first–fruits of this survey were obtained.

Abolition of prostration
In 1873, the Royal Siamese Government Gazette published an announcement on the abolition of prostration. In it, King Chulalongkorn declared, "The practice of prostration in Siam is severely oppressive. The subordinates have been forced to prostrate in order to elevate the dignity of the phu yai. I do not see how the practice of prostration will render any benefit to Siam. The subordinates find the performance of prostration a harsh physical practice. They have to go down on their knees for a long time until their business with the phu yai ends. They will then be allowed to stand up and retreat. This kind of practice is the source of oppression. Therefore, I want to abolish it." The Gazette directed that, "From now on, Siamese are permitted to stand up before the dignitaries. To display an act of respect, the Siamese may take a bow instead. Taking a bow will be regarded as a new form of paying respect."

Civic works

The construction of railways in Siam had a political motivation: to connect all of the country so as to better maintain control of it.

In 1901, the first railway was opened from Bangkok to Korat. In the same year, the first power plant of Siam produced electricity and electric lights first illuminated roadways.

In 1906 King Chulalongkorn adopted a Semang orphan boy named Khanung.

In 1907 he founded the royal rice varieties competition, at first only for the Tung Luang and Rangsit Canal districts. The next year it was held at Wat Suthat and since then has been held at various locations around the kingdom, by Chulalongkorn and his descendants.

Relations with the British Empire

Siamese authorities had exercised substantial control over Malay sultanates since Ayutthaya times. The sultans sought British support as a counterweight to Siamese influence. In 1909, the Anglo-Siamese Treaty of 1909 was agreed. Four sultanates (Kedah, Kelantan, Terengganu and Perlis) were brought under British influence in exchange for Siamese legal rights and a loan to construct railways in southern Siam.

Family

King Chulalongkorn was a prolific producer of children. He had 92 consorts during his lifetime who produced 77 surviving children.

Death and legacy

Chulalongkorn had visited Europe twice, in 1897 and 1907. In 1897 he travelled widely through Europe, learning all he could on many subjects to benefit the Siamese  people. He travelled and visited many European royal families. He spent much time in Britain and was inspired, among other things, to improve the health of his people by creating public health, or sanitary districts. In Sweden he studied the Forestry system. In 1907 he visited his son's school in Britain and consulted with European doctors in pursuit of a cure for his kidney disease.

King Chulalongkorn died on 23 October 1910 of kidney disease at the Amphorn Sathan Residential Hall in the Dusit Palace, and was succeeded by his son Vajiravudh (King Rama VI).

The royal Equestrian statue of King Chulalongkorn was finished in 1908 to celebrate the 40th anniversary of the king's reign. It was cast in bronze by a Parisian metallurgist.

Chulalongkorn University, founded in 1917 as the first university in Thailand, was named in his honour. On the campus stand the statues of Rama V and his son, Rama VI.

In 1997 a memorial pavilion was raised in honour of King Chulalongkorn in Ragunda, Sweden. This was done to commemorate King Chulalongkorn's visit to Sweden in 1897 when he also visited the World's Fair in Brussels. During the time when Swedish–Norwegian king Oscar II travelled to Norway for a council, Chulalongkorn went up north to study forestry. Beginning in Härnösand and travelling via Sollefteå and Ragunda he mounted a boat in the small village of Utanede in order to take him back through Sundsvall to Stockholm. His passage through Utanede left a mark on the village as one street was named after the king. The pavilion is erected next to that road.

The old 100 baht banknote of Series 14, circulated from 1994 to 2004, bears the statues of Rama V and Rama VI on its reverse. In 2005, the 100 baht banknote was revised to depict King Chulalongkorn in naval uniform and, in the background, abolishing slavery.
The 1,000 baht banknote of Series 16, issued in 2015, depicts the King Chulalongkorn monument, Ananda Samakhom Throne Hall, and the abolition of slavery.

Chulalongkorn was one of twenty "Most Influential Asians of the Century" for the 20th Century by Time Asia Magazine in 1999.

Honours

Military ranks 
 Field Marshal of the Royal Siamese Army
 Admiral of the Fleet of the Royal Siamese Navy

National honours 
1882 -  Founder and Sovereign of the Most Illustrious Order of the Royal House of Chakri, 

1868 -  Sovereign Knight of the Ancient and Auspicious Order of the Nine Gems, with Collar

1900 -  Founder and Sovereign of the Most Illustrious Order of Chula Chom Klao,

1909 -  Knight Grand Cordon of the Most Exalted Order of the White Elephant

1869 -  Knight Grand Cross of the Most Noble Order of the Crown of Thailand 

1882 -  Dushdi Mala Medal Pin of Arts and Science

1882 -  Dushdi Mala Medal Pin the government in His Majesty

1882 -  Chakra Mala Medal

1904 -  King Mongkut's Royal Cypher Medal 1st 

1901 -  King Chulalongkorn's Royal Cypher Medal 1st 

1897 -  King Chulalongkorn's Rajaruchi Medal

Foreign honours 
  Grand Cross of the Royal Hungarian Order of Saint Stephen, 1868 (Austria-Hungary)
  Grand Cross of the Royal and Distinguished Order of Charles III, 5 August 1871; with Collar, 16 October 1897 (Spain)
  Honorary Grand Cross of the Most Distinguished Order of St Michael and St George, 3 August 1878 (United Kingdom)
  Grand Cross of the Royal Order of Kamehameha I, 1881 (Kingdom of Hawaii)
  Grand Cross of the Royal Norwegian Order of Saint Olav, 23 November 1884 (Sweden-Norway)
  Knight of the Royal Order of the Seraphim, 11 July 1887 (Sweden-Norway)
  Grand Cordon of the Supreme Order of the Chrysanthemum, 6 October 1887 (Empire of Japan)
  Knight of the Order of the Elephant, 8 January 1892 (Denmark)
  Grand Cross of the Order of Saints Maurice and Lazarus, 1887 (Kingdom of Italy)
  Knight of the Order of St. Andrew the Apostle the First-called, 1891 (Russian Empire)
  Knight of the Supreme Order of the Most Holy Annunciation, 24 December 1891 (Kingdom of Italy)
  Grand Cross of the Sash of the Three Orders, 1897 (Kingdom of Portugal)
  Knight of the Order of the Black Eagle, 1897 (Kingdom of Prussia)
  Knight of the Order of the Rue Crown, 1897 (Kingdom of Saxony)
  Grand Cross of the Ludwig Order, 7 October 1897 (Grand Duchy of Hesse)
  Knight of the House Order of Fidelity, 1897 (Grand Duchy of Baden)
  Knight of the Order of Saint Hubert, 1906 (Kingdom of Bavaria)
  Grand Cross of the Order of Henry the Lion, 1907 (Duchy of Brunswick)

Ancestry

See also
 List of children of Mongkut
 List of consorts and children of Chulalongkorn
 List of people with the most children
 King Ananda Mahidol
 King Bhumibol Adulyadej

References

External links

 Chulalongkorn – Definition of Chulalongkorn
 King Chulalongkorn Day at Chiang Mai Best
 A clip of King Chulalongkorns 1897 visit to Sweden
  Investiture of His Majesty Somdetch Pra Paramindr Maha Chulalonkorn, King of Siam, with the Ensigns of a Knight Grand Cross of the Most Distinguished Order of Saint Michael and Saint George
Biography of His Majesty King Chulalongkorn Rama V 
Diaries and Travel Writings of King Chulalongkorn of Siam | Southeast Asia Digital Library

 
19th-century Chakri dynasty
20th-century Chakri dynasty
19th-century monarchs in Asia
19th-century Thai monarchs
20th-century Thai monarchs
Child monarchs from Asia
1853 births
1910 deaths
People from Bangkok
Deaths from kidney disease
Rama V period
Thai male Chao Fa
Children of Mongkut
Knights Grand Cordon of the Order of Chula Chom Klao
Honorary Knights Grand Cross of the Order of St Michael and St George
3
3
3
Knights Grand Cross of the Order of Saints Maurice and Lazarus
Grand Crosses of the Order of Saint Stephen of Hungary